Letters From Wolfie is a children's novel by Patti Sherlock. It is about Mark Cantrell, a boy living in the United States during the Vietnam War, and his dog, Wolfie. The novel was inspired by real events, and has a strong anti-war sentiment. Letters from Wolfie won the 2005 Merial Human-Animal Bond Award from the Dog Writers Association of America and was nominated for the Young Readers Medal in California, the Young Reader's Choice Award in Rhode Island, and the Maine Student Book Award. It has been translated into Japanese.

Characters in Letters From Wolfie 
Mark: A boy living in the United States during the Vietnam War, he decides to send his dog, Wolfie, to become an army dog.
Danny: Mark's brother and a soldier in the war until his injury from stepping into a mine; once outgoing, but becomes withdrawn after his experience in the war
Wolfie: Mark's dog who becomes an army dog. He is described as an energetic, playful German Shepherd mix.
Tucker: Wolfie's handler; a tough guy who softens after meeting Wolfie, writes letters to Mark
Claire: Mark's crush who helps Mark in his time of need. She is against the war.
Eve: Mark's mother who opposes the war.
Effie: Mark's neighbor who thinks Mark is very smart. She makes desserts for him mostly every day.
Randall: Marks dad, who strongly believes in the war.

References

External links

Letters from Wolfie, pattisherlock.com.

2004 American novels
2004 children's books
Children's historical novels
Children's novels about animals
American children's novels
Novels set during the Vietnam War
Anti-war novels